Alfred Boucher (23 September 1850 – 1934) was a French sculptor who was a mentor to Camille Claudel and a friend of Auguste Rodin.

Biography
Born in Bouy-sur-Ovin (Nogent-sur-Seine), he was the son of a farmhand who became the gardener of the sculptor Joseph-Marius Ramus, who, after recognizing Boucher's talent, opened his studio to him.

He won the Grand Prix du Salon in 1881 with La Piété Filiale. He then moved to Florence for a long period and was a favourite sculptor of presidents and royalty such as George I of Greece and Maria-Pia of Romania.

He provided inspiration and encouragement to the next generation of sculptors such as Laure Coutan and Camille Claudel. The latter was depicted in Camille Claudel lisant by Boucher and later she herself sculpted a bust of her mentor. Before moving to Florence and after having taught Claudel and others for over three years, Boucher asked Auguste Rodin to take over the instruction of his pupils. This is how Auguste Rodin and Claudel met and their tumultuous and passionate relationship started.

Ever generous and philanthropic, he founded the studio La Ruche in Montparnasse in 1902 to help young artists. He received the Grand Prix de sculpture de l'Exposition Universelle in 1900.  He died in Aix-les-Bains at the age of 84.

Gallery

A statuette of Joan of Arc was featured on an episode of Antique Road Show.

See also
Volubilis by Alfred Boucher

Exhibitions
Camille Claudel révélée..., sculpture by Alfred Boucher and Auguste Rodin, Nogent-sur-Seine, Agora Michel Baroin,
May 2003.
Alfred Boucher, 1850–1934, sculpteur humaniste, Musée Paul Dubois-Alfred Boucher, Nogent-sur-Seine, 27 May to 29 October 2000, (catalogue available with text by Jacques Piette, conservateur du musée municipal Paul Dubois – Alfred Boucher)

Notes

External links

Official site of Musée Paul Dubois-Alfred Boucher, Nogent-sur-Seine 
Biography of Alfred Boucher 
National Art Museum of Sport
 

1850 births
1934 deaths
People from Aube
20th-century French sculptors
20th-century French male artists
19th-century French sculptors
French male sculptors
19th-century French male artists
French expatriates in Italy